The 1959 Cornell Big Red football team was an American football team that represented Cornell University during the 1958 NCAA University Division football season. Cornell tied for fifth place in the Ivy League . 

In its 13th season under head coach George K. James, the team compiled a 5–4 record and outscored opponents 136 to 110. Dave Feeney was the team captain. 

Cornell's 3–4 conference record tied for fifth place in the Ivy League. The Big Red was outscored 115 to 77 by Ivy opponents. 

Cornell played its home games at Schoellkopf Field in Ithaca, New York.

Schedule

References

Cornell
Cornell Big Red football seasons
Cornell Big Red football